Christine Dranzoa (1 January 1967 – 28 June 2022) was a Ugandan university professor,  academic administrator, biologist, terrestrial ecologist and community leader. She was, at the time of her death, the Vice Chancellor of Muni University, one of the public universities in Uganda.

Background and education
She was born in 1967, in what was known as Moyo District at the time. Today, her home district is known as Adjumani District. Christine Dranzoa held the degree of Bachelor of Science (BSc) in Zoology, obtained in 1987, from Makerere University, the oldest university in East Africa. She also held the degree of Master of Science (MSc), in Zoology, obtained in 1991, also from Makerere University. Her degree of Doctor of Philosophy (PhD) in Biology was obtained from the same university in 1997. She also held about half a dozen certificates in management, conservation, and project planning from Ugandan and International institutions.

Work experience
In 1992 Christine Dranzoa joined Makerere University as a Lecturer in the Faculty of Veterinary Medicine Department of Wildlife and Animal Resources Management, she served as the pioneer head of the Wildlife and Animal Resources Department  from 1992   until 2005, at the Faculty of Veterinary Medicine, a department she had co-founded with her colleagues.

In 2005, she joined the university administration at Makerere university appointed as Deputy Director of the School of Postgraduate Studies at the university, serving in that capacity from 2005 until 2010. In 2010, Dr. Dranzoa was appointed to lead a three-person task-force to prepare for the creation of Muni University, the sixth public university in Uganda. In January 2012, when the university became operational, Professor Dranzoa became the founding Vice Chancellor of the institution.

Other responsibilities
Dr. Dranzoa served as the Honorary Secretary of the Forum for African Women Educationalists (FAWE), a pan-African Non-Governmental Organisation (NGO), founded in 1992, that is active in 32 African countries. FAWE aims to empower girls and women through gender-responsive education. Its members include human rights activists, gender specialists, researchers, education policy-makers, university vice-chancellors and ministers of education. The organisation maintains its headquarters in Nairobi, Kenya, and has regional offices in Dakar, Senegal.

In 2006, she co-founded Nile Women Initiative, a non-profit, Non-government organization, which aims to address the gender disparities affecting women in the West Nile sub-region of Uganda. She served as the Chairperson of the NGO.

Professor Dranzoa published widely in professional journals and has written chapters in scientific books pertaining to her fields of specialization. Her publications are detailed in her professional resume.

Death
On 28 June 2022, Christine Dranzoa died at 3.30 am, at Mulago National Referral Hospital, in Kampala. She was 55 years old.

See also
 Ugandan university leaders

References

External links
Website of Muni University
Website of Nile Women Initiative

1967 births
2022 deaths
Makerere University alumni
People from Moyo District
Madi people
Ugandan Christians
Vice-chancellors of universities in Uganda
Moyo District
Ugandan women academics
Academic staff of Makerere University
People from West Nile sub-region
Fellows of Uganda National Academy of Sciences
21st-century Ugandan women scientists
21st-century Ugandan scientists
Academic staff of Muni University